Grant Township is a township in Harrison County, in the U.S. state of Missouri.

Grant Township was established in 1845, taking its name from the local Grant family of pioneer citizens.

References

Townships in Missouri
Townships in Harrison County, Missouri